are a type of traditional East Asian lantern made of stone, wood, or metal. Originating in China, stone lanterns spread to Japan, Korea and Vietnam, though they are most commonly found in both China – extant in Buddhist temples and traditional Chinese gardens – and Japan. In Japan,  were originally used only in Buddhist temples, where they lined and illuminated paths. Lit lanterns were then considered an offering to Buddha. Their use in Shinto shrines and also private homes started during the Heian period (794–1185).

Stone lanterns have been known in China as early as the Han dynasty (202 BCE–220 CE), and prevailed from the Wei, Jin, Southern and Northern Dynasties all the way up to the Tang Dynasty, when they were introduced to Japan. The oldest extant bronze and stone lanterns in Japan can be found in Nara. Taima-dera has a stone lantern built during the Nara period, while Kasuga-taisha has one of the following Heian period.

During the Azuchi-Momoyama period (1568–1600), stone lanterns were popularized by tea masters, who used them as garden ornaments. Soon they started to develop new types according to the need. In modern gardens they have a purely ornamental function and are laid along paths, near water, or next to a building.

The segments express the idea that after death a person's physical body will go back to their original, elemental form.

Hanging lanterns

Also called ,  hanging lanterns are small, four- or six-sided and made in metal, copper or wood. They were introduced from China via Korea during the Nara period and were initially used in Imperial palaces.

Bronze lanterns 
Bronze lanterns, or  have a long history in Japan, but are not as common or as diverse in form as the stone ones. In their classic form they are divided in sections that represent the five elements of Buddhist cosmology.

Many have been designated as Cultural Properties of Japan by the Japanese government. The one in front of Tōdai-ji's  for example has been declared a National Treasure. Kōfuku-ji has in its museum one built in 816 and which is also a National Treasure.

Stone lanterns 

One of the main historic centres of production of stone lanterns is Okazaki, Aichi. The traditional stonemasonry there was registered by the government as a Japanese craft in 1979.

Structure 

The traditional components of a stone (or bronze) lantern are, from top to bottom:
 A. 
 The onion-shaped part at the very top of the finial.
 B. 
 C. 
 A conical or pyramidal umbrella covering the fire box. The corners may curl upwards to form the so-called .
 D. 
 The fire box where the fire is lit.
 E. 
 The platform for the fire box.
 F. 
 The post, typically oriented vertically and either circular or square in cross-section, possibly with a corresponding "belt" near its middle; occasionally also formed as a sideways coin or disk, as a set of tall thin lotus petals, or as between one and four arched legs (in "snow-viewing" lanterns); absent in hanging lanterns.
 
 The base, usually rounded or hexagonal, and absent in a buried lantern (see below).
 
 A variously shaped slab of rock sometimes present under the base.

The lantern's structure is meant to symbolize the five elements of Buddhist cosmology. With the sole exception of the fire box, any parts may be absent. It also may lack an umbrella.

Types
Stone lanterns can be classified into five basic groups, each possessing numerous variants.

Pedestal lanterns 

, or pedestal lanterns, are the most common. The base is always present and the fire box is decorated with carvings of deer or peonies. More than 20 subtypes exist. The following are among the most common:

 
 Named after Kasuga-taisha, it is very common at both temples and shrines. The fire box is either hexagonal or square with carvings representing deer, the sun or the moon. Tall and thin, it is often found near the second  of a shrine.
 
This style goes back to at least as the Heian period. The post has rings carved at the bottom, middle and top, and the hexagonal base and middle platform are carved with lotuses. The  seems to stem from a citron tree that used to stand near the lantern at Kasuga Shrine. This type of lantern became popular in tea house gardens during the Edo period.

Buried lanterns

, or buried lanterns, are moderately sized lanterns whose post does not rest on a base, but goes directly into the ground. Because of their modest size, they are used along paths or at stone basins in gardens. The following are some examples:

 
 This common type is named after Furuta Shigenari, a nobleman popularly known as Oribe, who designed it to be used in gardens. The fire box is a cube with a window on each side: the front and rear are square, the right and left are shaped as a crescent moon and the full moon respectively. The umbrella is small and four-sided.
 
This style was born during the persecution of the Christian religion in Japan, when many continued to practice their faith in secret.
  
 A typical , its fire box has square openings on two facing sides and double-triangle openings on the other two. This type of lantern is used at the Katsura Villa in Kyoto. The roof is square and rounded.

Movable lanterns
, or movable lanterns, owe their name to the fact that they just rest on the ground, and are not fixed in any way. This type probably derived from hanging lanterns, which they often strongly resemble, left to rest on the ground. They are commonly used around house entrances and along paths.

Its name, "three lights lantern", is due to its windows, shaped like the sun and the moon in the front and rear, and like a star at the ends. This type of lantern is usually placed near water. It can be found in the garden of the Katsura Villa.

Legged lanterns
, or legged lanterns, have as a base not a post but from one to six curved legs, and a wide umbrella with a finial either low or absent. Relatively low, they are used exclusively in gardens. The traditional placement is near the water, and a three-legged lantern will often have two legs in the water, and one on land. The umbrella can be round or have from three to eight sides, while the fire box is usually hexagonal.

Legged lanterns were probably developed during the Momoyama period, but the oldest extant examples, found at the Katsura Villa in Kyoto, go back only to the early Edo period.

are lanterns made with rough, unpolished stones.

Gallery

Hanging metal lanterns

Bronze lanterns

Stone lanterns

variants

See also 
 Traditional lighting equipment of Japan
 Glossary of Shinto

Notes

References

External links

Buddhist ritual implements
Garden ornaments
Japanese Buddhist architecture
Light fixtures
Shinto architecture
Shinto religious objects